Jalan Tengku Ampuan Bariah (Terengganu state route 143) is a major road in Kuala Terengganu, Terengganu, Malaysia. It was named after Tengku Ampuan Bariah of Terengganu, the consort of Sultan Mahmud Al-Muktafi Billah Shah from 1979 until 1998.

List of junctions and towns 

Roads in Terengganu